Komodo Edit is a free and open source text editor for dynamic programming languages. It was introduced in January 2007 to complement ActiveState's commercial Komodo IDE. As of version 4.3, Komodo Edit is built atop the Open Komodo project. Komodo IDE is no longer supported and maintained by developers for Python.

History
Komodo Edit 4.0 was originally a freeware version of Komodo IDE 4.0, released in 2007-02-14.

On 2008-03-05, ActiveState Software Inc. announced Komodo Edit 4.3 to be open-sourced software, licensed under Mozilla Public License (MPL), GNU General Public License (GPL), and GNU Lesser Public License (LGPL).

Open Komodo
It is a subset version of Komodo Edit, with initial goal of Web development. The code was to be available between late October or early November 2007, with Open Komodo code repository created by ActiveState in August 2007.

On 2007-10-30, ActiveState Software Inc. announced the release of Open Komodo. The initial release was 1.0.0 Alpha 1.

Komodo Snapdragon
It is an announced initiative from ActiveState to create an open source development environment that promotes open standards on the web. It was to be based on Open Komodo.

Features
Many of Komodo's features are derived from an embedded Python interpreter.

Open Komodo uses Mozilla and Scintilla code base to provide its features, including support for many popular languages (including Python, Perl, PHP, Ruby, Tcl, SQL, Smarty, CSS, HTML, and XML), across all common operating systems (Linux, OS X, and Windows). The editor component is implemented using the Netscape Plugin Application Programming Interface (NPAPI), with the Scintilla view embedded in the XML User Interface Language (XUL) interface in the same manner as a web browser plugin.

Both Komodo Edit and IDE support user customizing via plug-ins and macros. Komodo plug-ins are based on Mozilla Add-ons and extensions can be searched for, downloaded, configured, installed and updated from within the application. Available extensions include a functions list, pipe features, additional language support and user interface enhancements.

Komodo IDE has features found in an integrated development environment (IDE), such as integrated debugger support, Document Object Model (DOM) viewer, interactive shells, source code control integration, and the ability to select the engine used to run regular expressions, to ensure compatibility with the final deployment target.

The commercial version also adds code browsing, a database explorer, collaboration, support for many popular source code control systems, and more. Independent implementations of some of these features, such as the database editor, Git support, and remote FTP file access, are available in the free version via Komodo Edit's plugin system.

References

External links

Open Komodo

Unix text editors
Windows text editors
MacOS text editors
Free text editors
Free software programmed in C
Linux text editors
Linux integrated development environments
Free integrated development environments
Gecko-based software
Free software programmed in C++
Free software programmed in Python
Software that uses XUL
Software that uses Scintilla
Software using the Mozilla license